The Soyuz-FG launch vehicle was an improved version of the Soyuz-U from the R-7 family of rockets, designed and constructed by TsSKB-Progress in Samara, Russia. Guidance, navigation, and control system was developed and manufactured by "Polisvit" Special Design Bureau (Kharkov, Ukraine). 

Soyuz-FG made its maiden flight on 20 May 2001, carrying a Progress cargo spacecraft to the International Space Station (ISS). It was retired after the 25 September 2019 launch of Soyuz MS-15 to the ISS; the analog control system significantly limited its capabilities and prompted its replacement by Soyuz-2. From 30 October 2002 to 25 September 2019, the Soyuz-FG was the only vehicle used by the Russian Federal Space Agency to launch Soyuz-TMA and Soyuz-MS crewed spacecraft to the ISS. 

For uncrewed flights, Soyuz-FG optionally flew with a Fregat upper stage, developed and produced by Lavochkin Association in Khimki. The maiden flight of this configuration occurred on 2 June 2003, the first of ten such launches. Launches of the Soyuz-FG/Fregat configuration were marketed by a European-Russian company called Starsem. 

Soyuz-FG was launched from the Baikonur Cosmodrome in Kazakhstan, from Gagarin's Start (pad LC-1/5) for crewed missions, and from LC-31/6 for satellite launches with the Fregat variant.

The Soyuz-FG performed 64 successful launches until its first failure on 11 October 2018 with the Soyuz MS-10 mission. A video recording of the spaceflight released several weeks later suggested a faulty sensor, resulted in the destruction of the rocket. The crew, NASA astronaut Nick Hague and Russian cosmonaut Aleksey Ovchinin, escaped safely.

Launch history

See also 

 Soyuz (spacecraft)
 Soyuz programme
 Russian Federal Space Agency
 Starsem

References

External links 

 Russian Federal Space Agency about Soyuz-FG 
 LV's manufacturer TsSKB-Progress about Soyuz-FG 

Soyuz program
R-7 (rocket family)
Space launch vehicles of Russia
Vehicles introduced in 2001